The Chinese Ambassador to Barbados is the official representative of the People's Republic of China to Barbados.

List of representatives

See also 
 Ambassadors of China
 Barbados–People's Republic of China relations
 List of ambassadors and high commissioners to and from Barbados

Notes

References 
 Directory of Officials and Organizations in China, Volume 1

External links 
Embassy of the People's Republic of China in Barbados

 
China
Barbados